Statistics of Czechoslovak First League in the 1977–78 season.

Overview
It was contested by 16 teams, and Zbrojovka Brno won the championship. Karel Kroupa was the league's top scorer with 20 goals.

Stadia and locations

League standings

Results

Top goalscorers

References

Czechoslovakia - List of final tables (RSSSF)

Czechoslovak First League seasons
Czech
1977–78 in Czechoslovak football